Stefanie Werle was a female international table tennis player from Austria.

She won a bronze medal at the 1937 World Table Tennis Championships in the women's doubles with Lillian Hutchings.

See also
 List of table tennis players
 List of World Table Tennis Championships medalists

References

Austrian female table tennis players
World Table Tennis Championships medalists